Asinisi Fina Opio is a Ugandan Biomedical Scientist, researcher and a professor at Bishop Stuart University. Fina is a member of the Council of Science and Technology, The Indian Phytopathological Society, the Agricultural Technical Committee, and the African Crop Science Society.

Early life and career 
In 1979, Asinisi Opio obtained her Master of Science (M.Sc) rom the University of Nairobi located in Kenya, and in 1992 while at the Sokoine University of Agriculture, she obtained a Doctorate Of philosophy (PhD) in Plant Pathology.

later, Fina became a Program  Leader of the Beans Program and Principal Research Officer, she became a Director of Research of Namulonge Agricultural and Animal Production Research Institute.

Achievements & awards 
1998-2000:She was awarded as an outstanding performance Award, in recognition of Excellent Execution of her official Duties as a Scientist in Namulonge Agricultural and Animal Production Research Institute (NARO) during the Period 1998–2000.

2004:Opio Fina was recognized by Forum for Women Educationalist in Uganda. She was also nominated for the SARAH NTIRU Award. She was the second run-up for Women Achievers of the year in Uganda. In 2006, Opio was nominated for the Presidential Science Excellence Award and competed with top eminent scientists in Uganda.

References

External links 
DR. FINA A. OPIO

Ugandan women academics
Academic staff of Bishop Stuart University
University of Nairobi alumni
Sokoine University of Agriculture alumni
Year of birth missing (living people)
Fellows of the African Academy of Sciences